India competed at the 2019 World Athletics Championships in Doha, Qatar, from 24 September to  06 October 2019. India was represented by 23 athletes.

Results

Men
Track and road events

Field events

Women
Track and road events

Field events

Mixed
Track and road events

References

India IAAF World Athletics Championships, DOHA 2019. IAAF. Retrieved 2019-09-25.

Nations at the 2019 World Athletics Championships
World Championships in Athletics
2019